Trevor Wallace Howard-Smith (29 September 1913 – 7 January 1988) was an English stage, film, and television actor. After varied work in the theatre, he achieved star status with his role in the film Brief Encounter (1945), followed by The Third Man (1949). He is also known for his roles in Golden Salamander (1950), The Clouded Yellow (1951), Mutiny on the Bounty (1962), The Charge of the Light Brigade (1968), Battle of Britain (1969), Lola (1969), Ryan's Daughter (1970), Superman (1978), Windwalker (1981), and Gandhi (1982). For his performance in Sons and Lovers (1960) he was nominated for the Academy Award for Best Actor.

Early life
Howard was born in Cliftonville, Kent, England the son of Mabel Grey (Wallace) and Arthur John Howard-Smith. Although Howard later claimed to have been born in 1916, the year quoted by most reference sources, he was born in 1913 (this is supported by school and other records).

His father was an insurance underwriter for Lloyd's of London, serving as representative in Colombo, Sri Lanka and elsewhere; Trevor spent the first eight years of his life travelling around the world. He was educated at Clifton College(to which he left in his will a substantial legacy for a drama scholarship) and at the Royal Academy of Dramatic Art (RADA). In 1933, at the end of his first year, he was chosen as best actor in his class for his performance as Benedict in a school production of Much Ado About Nothing. While Howard was still studying, he made his professional debut at the Gate Theatre in Revolt in a Reformatory (1934).

When he left school he worked regularly on stage, including in Sheridan's The Rivals, several performances at Stratford-upon-Avon, and in a two-year run in the original production of French Without Tears.

Military service
Howard did little to stop the stories that he had a courageous wartime service in the British Army's Royal Corps of Signals, which earned him much respect among fellow actors and fans. However, as set out in a 2001 biography of Howard by the journalist Terence Pettigrew, files held in the Public Record Office revealed he had actually been discharged from the British Army in 1943 for mental instability and having a "psychopathic personality". Initially Howard's widow, actress Helen Cherry, denied this, but after being confronted with the official records, she said that Howard's mother had claimed he was a holder of the Military Cross adding that her late husband had an honourable military record with "nothing to be ashamed of".

The London Gazette shows that Trevor Wallace Howard-Smith (247202) was actually commissioned into the South Staffordshire Regiment as a Second lieutenant effective 3 October 1942, but he had relinquished his commission on 2 October 1943 "on account of "ill-health", still a Second Lieutenant. Contradicting the post-war stories that he had won the Military Cross and high promotion.

Career
After a theatrical role in The Recruiting Officer (1943), Howard began working in films with an uncredited part The Way Ahead (1944), directed by Carol Reed. He was in a big stage hit, A Soldier for Christmas (1944), and a production of Eugene O'Neill's Anna Christie (1944). Howard received his first credit for The Way to the Stars (1945), playing a pilot.

Howard's performance in The Way Ahead came to the attention of David Lean, who was looking for someone to play the role of Alec in Brief Encounter (1945). Lean recommended him to Noël Coward, who agreed with the suggestion, and the success of the film launched Howard's film career.

He followed it with I See a Dark Stranger (1946) with Deborah Kerr, and Green for Danger (1947), starring Alastair Sim. Both films were successful as was They Made Me a Fugitive (1947). That year British exhibitors voted Howard the 10th most popular British star at the box office. So Well Remembered (1948) was made with American talent and money and was a hit in Britain but lost money overall.  Howard was reunited with Lean for The Passionate Friends (1949), but the film was not a success.

However, The Third Man (1949), which Howard starred in alongside Orson Welles and Joseph Cotten for Carol Reed from a story by Graham Greene, was a huge international success, and became the film of which Howard was most proud. During filming in Vienna, Howard was keen to get to his favourite bar for a drink as soon as filming had finished for the evening. On one occasion Howard was in too much of a hurry to change out of his uniform as a British Army major. After a few drinks, he got into an argument and attracted the attention of the Military Police who detained him for impersonating a British officer. The MPs, being non-commissioned officers, then had to summon an officer to arrest him. On the lieutenant's arrival the matter was settled by an apology.

Howard was the lead in Golden Salamander (1950) and played Peter Churchill in Odette (1950) with Anna Neagle, a big hit in Britain. It was directed by Herbert Wilcox who put Howard under contract. He loaned Howard to Betty Box and Ralph Thomas to make The Clouded Yellow (1950), a popular thriller with Jean Simmons. These films helped Howard be voted the 2nd biggest British star at the box office in 1950 and the 5th biggest (and eleventh bigger over-all) in 1951.

Howard was reunited with Carol Reed for Outcast of the Islands (1952) and he made a war film, Gift Horse (1952). That year he made his final appearance in Britain's ten most popular actors, coming in at number nine. He was in another adaptation of a Graham Greene story, The Heart of the Matter (1953). Greene also wrote and produced Howard's next film, the British-Italian The Stranger's Hand (1954).
Howard was in a French movie, The Lovers of Lisbon (1955), then supported Jose Ferrer in a war film from Warwick Pictures, The Cockleshell Heroes (1955), which was popular in Britain.

Howard's first Hollywood film was Run for the Sun (1956), where he played a villain to Richard Widmark's hero. He made a cameo in Around the World in 80 Days (1956) and again played a villain to an American star, Victor Mature, in Warwick's Interpol (1957).

Howard starred in Manuela (1957) then supported William Holden in Carol Reed's The Key (1958), for which he received the Best Actor award from the British Academy of Film and Television Arts. When William Holden dropped out of the lead of The Roots of Heaven (1958), Howard stepped in - the star part in a Hollywood film (although top billing went to Errol Flynn).

After a thriller Moment of Danger (1960) he was in Sons and Lovers (1960), for which he was nominated for an Academy Award for Best Actor. He was nominated for a BAFTA on four other occasions. and received two other Emmy nominations, one as a lead and the other as a supporting actor. He also received three Golden Globe Award nominations.

Howard was reunited with Holden for The Lion (1962). He was Captain Bligh to Marlon Brando's Fletcher Christian in MGM's remake of  Mutiny on the Bounty (1962). He was in a TV movie production of Hedda Gabler (1962) and played the title prime minister in "The Invincible Mr Disraeli" (1963), an episode of the Hallmark Hall of Fame for which he won an Emmy Award for his role then supported Robert Mitchum in Man in the Middle (1964) and Cary Grant in Father Goose (1964). After a cameo in Operation Crossbow (1965), Howard supported Frank Sinatra in Von Ryan's Express (1965), Brando and Yul Brynner in Morituri (1965), and Rod Taylor in The Liquidator (1965). After a leading role in The Poppy Is Also a Flower (1966) he made two movies with Brynner, Triple Cross (1966) and The Long Duel (1967).

Howard had a change of pace supporting Hayley Mills in Pretty Polly (1968). He went back to military roles: The Charge of the Light Brigade (1968), as Lord Cardigan, and Battle of Britain (1969), as Air Vice Marshal Keith Park. He had support parts in Lola (1969) and Ryan's Daughter (1970), the latter for David Lean.

He made a Swedish film The Night Visitor (1971) then settled into a career as a character actor: To Catch a Spy (1971), supporting Kirk Douglas; Mary, Queen of Scots (1971), as Sir William Cecil; Kidnapped (1971); Pope Joan (1972); Ludwig (1972); The Offence (1972), with Sean Connery; A Doll's House (1973), for Joseph Losey; Who? (1974), supporting Elliott Gould; and Catholics (1974) for British TV.

He appeared in some horror films - Craze (1974), Persecution (1974) - and the more prestigious 11 Harrowhouse (1974), in which his wife Helen Cherry starred with him. In The Count of Monte Cristo (1975), he mentored Richard Chamberlain. He played military men in Hennessy (1975) and Conduct Unbecoming (1975). Around this time he complained that he had to work so hard because of the high rate of tax in Britain.

Howard could be found in Albino (1976), shot in Rhodesia; The Bawdy Adventures of Tom Jones (1976); Aces High (1976); Eliza Fraser (1976), shot in Australia; The Last Remake of Beau Geste (1977); and Stevie (1978). He was one of many names in Superman (1978), Hurricane (1979), Meteor (1979) and The Sea Wolves (1980). He appeared in a TV series Shillingbury Tales (1980–81). One of his strangest films, and one he took great delight in, was Vivian Stanshall's Sir Henry at Rawlinson End (1980), in which he played the title role.  He and Celia Johnson from Brief Encounter were reunited in Staying On (1980) for British TV.

Howard was also top-billed in Windwalker (1981).

Final years
Howard appeared in some prestigious movies towards the end of his career: The Deadly Game (1982), The Missionary (1982), Gandhi (1982), George Washington (1984), Shaka Zulu (1986), Dust (1985), and Peter the Great (1986).

At the time of filming White Mischief (1988) on location in Kenya during 1987, Howard was seriously ill and suffering from alcoholism. The company wanted to sack him, but co-star Sarah Miles was determined that Howard's distinguished film career would not end that way. In an interview with Terence Pettigrew for his biography of Howard, Miles describes how she gave an ultimatum to the executives, threatening to quit the production if they got rid of him. His final film role was in The Dawning in 1988.

Throughout his film career Howard insisted that all his contracts include a clause excusing him from work whenever a cricket Test match was being played.

Howard recorded two Shakespeare performances, the first, recorded in the 1960s, was as Petruchio opposite Margaret Leighton's Kate in Caedmon Records' complete recording of The Taming of the Shrew; the second was in the title role of King Lear for the BBC World Service in 1986.

Personal life
He married stage and screen actress Helen Cherry. 

A British government document leaked to the Sunday Times in 2003 showed that Howard was among almost 300 people to decline an official honour of the United Kingdom. He declined to be made a CBE in 1982.

Death
Howard died, aged 74, at his home in Arkley, Barnet on 7 January 1988. The cause of death was hepatic failure and cirrhosis of the liver.

Appearances

Filmography

 The Way Ahead (1944) as Officer on Ship (uncredited)
 The Way to the Stars (1945) as Squadron Leader Carter
 Brief Encounter (1945) as Alec Harvey
 I See a Dark Stranger (1946) as David Baynes
 Green for Danger (1946) as Dr. Barnes
 They Made Me a Fugitive (1947) as Clem
 So Well Remembered (1947) as Richard Whiteside
 The Passionate Friends (1949) as Professor Steven Stratton
 The Third Man (1949) as Maj. Calloway
 Golden Salamander (1950) as David Redfern
 Odette (1950) as Captain Peter Churchill / Raoul
 The Clouded Yellow (1950) as Maj. David Somers
 Lady Godiva Rides Again (1951) as Guest at Theater Accepting Program (uncredited)
 Outcast of the Islands (1952) as Peter Willems
 Gift Horse (1952) as Lieutenant Commander Hugh Algernon Fraser
 The Heart of the Matter (1953) as Harry Scobie
 La mano dello straniero (1954) as Major Roger Court
 Les amants du Tage (1955) as Inspector Lewis
 The Cockleshell Heroes (1955) as Captain Thompson
 Run for the Sun (1956) as Browne
 Around the World in 80 Days (1956) as Denis Fallentin – Reform Club Member
 Interpol (1957) as Frank McNally
 Manuela (1957) as James Prothero, released as Stowaway Girl in the US
 A Day in Trinidad, Land of Laughter (1957, Short) as Narrator
 The Key (1958) as Captain Chris Ford
 The Roots of Heaven (1958) as Morel
 Malaga (1960) as John Bain
 Sons and Lovers (1960) as Walter Morel
 The Lion (1962) as John Bullit
 Mutiny on the Bounty (1962) as Captain William Bligh
 Man in the Middle (1963) as Major John Darryl Kensington
 Father Goose (1964) as Houghton
 Operation Crossbow (1965) as Professor Lindermann
 Von Ryan's Express (1965) as Maj. Eric Fincham
 Morituri (1965) as Colonel Statter
 The Liquidator (1965) as Mostyn
 Eagle in a Cage (1965, Hallmark Hall of Fame) as Napoleon
 The Poppy Is Also a Flower (1966) as Sam Lincon
 Triple Cross (1966) MI 5
 The Long Duel (1967) as Young
 Pretty Polly (1967) as Robert Hook
 The Charge of the Light Brigade (1968) as Lord Cardigan
 Battle of Britain (1969) as Air Vice-Marshal Sir Keith Park
 Twinky (1969) as Lola's Grandfather
 Ryan's Daughter (1970) as Father Hugh Collins
 The Night Visitor (1971) as The Inspector
 To Catch a Spy (1971) as Sir Trevor Dawson
 Mary, Queen of Scots (1971) as William Cecil
 Pope Joan (1972) as Pope Leo
 Ludwig (1972) as Richard Wagner
 The Offence (1972) as Detective Superintendent Cartwright
 Kidnapped (1973) as Lord Advocate Grant
 A Doll's House (1973) as Dr Rank
 Who? (1973) as Colonel Azarin
 Catholics (1973) as The Abbot
 Craze (1974) as Supt. Bellamy
 11 Harrowhouse (1974) as Clyde Massey
 Persecution (1974) aka Sheba, The Graveyard, The Terror of Sheba as Paul Bellamy
 Cause for Concern (1974) as Narrator
 The Count of Monte Cristo (1975, TV movie) as Abbe Faria
 Hennessy (1975) as Commander Rice
 Conduct Unbecoming (1975) as Colonel Benjamin Strang
 Albino (1976) as Johannes
 The Bawdy Adventures of Tom Jones (1976) as Squire Western
 Aces High (1976) as Silkin
 Eliza Fraser (1976) as Captain Foster Fyans
 The Last Remake of Beau Geste (1977) as Sir Hector
 Babel Yemen (1977 short) as Narrator
 Slavers (1978) as Alec Mackenzie
 Stevie (1978) as The Man
 Superman (1978) as 1st Elder
 The Spirit of Adventure: Night Flight (1979, TV Movie) as Riviere
 Hurricane (1979) as Father Malone
 Meteor (1979) as Sir Michael Hughes
 Flashpoint Africa (1980) as Programme Controller
 The Shillingbury Blowers (1980) as Dan 'Saltie' Wicklow
 The Sea Wolves (1980) as Jack Cartwright
 Sir Henry at Rawlinson End (1980) as Sir Henry Rawlinson
 Windwalker (1980) as Windwalker
 Staying On (1980 TV movie) as Colonel Tusker Smalley
 Arch of Triumph (1980)
 Light Years Away, aka Les Années lumière (1981) as Yoshka Poliakeff
 The Great Muppet Caper (1981) as Aggressive Man in Restaurant (uncredited)
 No Country for Old Men (1981, TV Movie)
 Inside the Third Reich (1982, TV Movie) as Professor Heinrich Tessnow
 Deadly Game (1982, TV Movie) as Gustave Kummer
 The Missionary (1982) as Lord Henry Ames
 Gandhi (1982) as Judge R. S. Broomfield
 Sword of the Valiant (1984) as The King
 Dust (1985) as Le père
 God Rot Tunbridge Wells! (1985) as Georg Frederich Handel
 Memory of the Camps (1985, Documentary) as Narrator
 Time After Time (1986) as Brigadier
 Foreign Body (1986) as Dr Stirrup
 Christmas Eve (1986, TV Movie) as Maitland
 Hand in Glove (1987, TV Movie) as Vicar
 White Mischief (1988) as Jack Soames
 The Unholy (1988) as Father Silva
 The Dawning (1988) as Grandfather

Television 
 The Love Boat (1984 TV Series) as Sir Albert Demerest
 George Washington (1984 miniseries) as Lord Fairfax
 Shaka Zulu (1986–1989) as Lord Charles Somerset (final appearance)
 Peter the Great (1986 TV series) as Sir Isaac Newton

Notes
Citations

Bibliography

External links
 
 
 Trevor Howard papers archived at Bristol University
 

1913 births
1988 deaths
Military personnel from Kent
Alumni of RADA
Best British Actor BAFTA Award winners
Outstanding Performance by a Lead Actor in a Miniseries or Movie Primetime Emmy Award winners
People educated at Clifton College
English male film actors
English male stage actors
English male television actors
South Staffordshire Regiment officers
People from Margate
People from Bushey
Deaths from liver failure
Deaths from cirrhosis
Deaths from hepatitis
Male actors from Kent
Male actors from Hertfordshire
20th-century English male actors
Alcohol-related deaths in England
British Army personnel of World War II